Damon Keeve is a former US Olympic Judo team member.  He competed in the 1992 and 1996 Olympics.  Keeve is a former high school football coach.

References

Olympic judoka of the United States
American male judoka
Pan American Games medalists in judo
Pan American Games silver medalists for the United States
Pan American Games bronze medalists for the United States
Judoka at the 1992 Summer Olympics
Judoka at the 1996 Summer Olympics
Judoka at the 1987 Pan American Games
Judoka at the 1995 Pan American Games
Medalists at the 1987 Pan American Games
Medalists at the 1995 Pan American Games
20th-century American people